Poppies can refer to:

Poppy, a flowering plant
The Poppies (disambiguation) - multiple uses
Poppies (film) - Children's BBC remembrance animation
"Poppies", a song by Patti Smith Group from their 1976 album Radio Ethiopia
"Poppies", the first track on the debut album by Marcy Playground.
 Remembrance poppy, commemorates soldiers who have died in war; mainly used in current and former Commonwealth states.

See also
 Poppy (disambiguation)
 Poppy & the Jezebels, a pop band in the UK
 Poppy Factory (band), a band from Bradford, England